David Clement Johnson (born 1953), is a male former athlete who competed for England.

Athletics career
Johnson was a double National Champion after winning the 1972 and 1977 AAA National Championship title in the triple jump.

Johnson represented England in the triple jump, at the 1978 Commonwealth Games in Edmonton, Alberta, Canada.

References

1953 births
English male triple jumpers
Athletes (track and field) at the 1978 Commonwealth Games
Living people
Commonwealth Games competitors for England